Kathy Kinney (born November 3, 1954, in Stevens Point, Wisconsin) is an American actress, voice actress, and comedian. She gained considerable popularity in the late 1990s for playing Mimi Bobeck, the outrageously made-up, flamboyantly vulgar, and vindictive nemesis of Drew Carey on the sitcom The Drew Carey Show. She had been involved in television, feature film, and stage work for years.

Biography

Early life
Kinney was born in Stevens Point, Wisconsin, the daughter of Irish American parents Harold Kinney, an automobile dealer, and Marian Kinney. Her father died when she was 15 years old.

After high school, Kathy Kinney worked for the California Conservation Corps between 1972 and 1974.  After completing a six-month Back Country season in Kings Canyon, she left the program with thousands of dollars in scholarships.   She attended the University of Wisconsin–Stevens Point in the seventies and officially received her degree in 2016. In 1976, she moved to New York City, where she found work as a secretary at WCBS-TV.  Her boss enjoyed hunting, and sometimes she chatted with him about his hunting trips, occasionally quipping, "So, did you kill anything this week?" She used this experience to inspire herself for the role of Mimi. During this time at WCBS she worked nights at New York comedy clubs to improve her improvisational comedy skills.  This led to a job teaching improv classes. Director Bill Sherwood attended; he later wrote a part for her in his 1986 film, Parting Glances.

Career
Armed with the success of Parting Glances, Kinney visited friends in Los Angeles, and decided to permanently move there to pursue a career in acting.  In L.A., Kinney worked regularly as a character actress, getting small roles in various TV series such as Seinfeld (Season 4, Episode 22, "The Handicap Spot)," Lois & Clark: The New Adventures of Superman (with Drew Carey, contemporaneous with The Drew Carey Shows second season), Grace Under Fire, Full House, Boy Meets World, The Larry Sanders Show, and My Name Is Earl.  Her first memorable television role is generally considered her regular stint on Newhart as Miss Goddard, the town librarian (1989–1990).

Kinney has avoided auditions for what she calls "the heavy-girl roles". Critics occasionally grumble that Mimi Bobeck, her character on The Drew Carey Show, is a waddling fat joke, but her weight has never seemed to be the point of a fat joke. "One time I had to say to Drew, 'Aw, you're just fat,' as the ultimate put-down. I personally don't like it, but if fat jokes slip in because they're funny, I don't care." She is, however, less comfortable about being typecast because of her weight.  "Once in a while I would lose some weight, just by accident, and someone would say to me, 'You're going to diet yourself out of a career,'" she said. "And I tell them 'I'm losing weight, not my talent.' Why is it the first thing [some people] look at is the shape? It points up to me the prejudice that still exists."

The Drew Carey Show aired from 1995 - 2004. Mimi was originally intended for a one-time appearance on the pilot, when she interviewed for a cosmetics job at Winfred-Louder. When she was turned down due to her garish makeup, Mimi raised a fuss and threatened to sue. Positive public reaction prompted the Mimi storyline to continue (the store hired her as a secretary to prevent her from suing).

Kinney has also appeared in the American version of Whose Line Is It Anyway?, again working with Drew Carey. Kinney's filmography includes Arachnophobia, Stanley & Iris, Scrooged, Three Fugitives, Lenny the Wonder Dog, and This Boy's Life. In 2006 she visited Iraq with former co-star Drew Carey and his Improv All-Star Team, a series of USO performances for American troops; film of her appearance appears in the documentary Patriot Act: A Jeffrey Ross Home Movie.

In 2008, Kinney became the co-creator and star of MrsP.com, an entertainment website for children. Kinney portrays Mrs. P, an eccentric redhead who loves books and reads classic children's stories from her magical library. After nearly two years in development, the site launched in beta on November 10, 2008.

On March 24, 2009, Kinney appeared in character as Mimi in the beginning of The Late Late Show with Craig Ferguson. A week later (April Fools' Day), Kinney reprised her role as Mimi during that day's The Price Is Right, hosted by Carey, appearing as a guest model. She repeated the role on April Fool's Day 2010, this time usurping the post of executive producer. She replaced the show's announcer with a man in a monkey suit along with using four male models.

She guest starred on The Penguins of Madagascar as Rhonda the walrus, Marlene's disgusting roommate, in the 2009 episode "Roomies."  Rhonda made a second appearance in the episode "The Hoboken Surprise" in 2011.

In March 2010, Kinney co-authored with Cindy Ratzlaff a book entitled Queen of Your Own Life: The Grown-up Woman's Guide to Claiming Happiness and Getting the Life You Deserve, published by Harlequin.

Kinney also guest-starred on The Secret Life of the American Teenager. Beginning in March 2011, Kinney appeared in Drew Carey's Improv-A-Ganza.

In September 2019, Kinney appeared on American Housewife. She played the lunch lady in the episode "Bigger Kids, Bigger Problems" and she reunites with former co-stars Drew Carey, Ryan Stiles and Diedrich Bader as part of ABC's Cast from the Past Week.

Filmography

Film

Television

References

External links

MrsP.com

1954 births
American film actresses
American television actresses
American people of Irish descent
Living people
People from Stevens Point, Wisconsin
Actresses from Wisconsin
20th-century American actresses
21st-century American actresses
University of Wisconsin–Stevens Point alumni